CenturyLink of Florida, Inc. is a telephone operating company providing local telephone services in Florida owned by Lumen Technologies.

The company was established in 1925, later changing its name to United Telephone Company of Florida upon expansion of the United Telephone System. It was owned by United Utilities.

United Utilities later became United Telecom, and acquired Sprint Long Distance from GTE. The company changed its name to Sprint Corporation. The company changed its name to Sprint-Florida, Inc. in 1996. Later, the Central Telephone Company of Florida was merged into Sprint-Florida, which was internally transferred to the control of Central Telephone Company, a subsidiary of Centel, which was owned by Sprint.

Sprint Corporation, in 2005, acquired Nextel and changed its name to Sprint Nextel Corporation. The company intended to spin off its wireline assets into a separate company, which in 2006 occurred as Embarq Corporation. Sprint-Florida then became Embarq Florida, Inc.

Embarq was acquired by CenturyTel in 2009, which in 2010 changed its name to CenturyLink. Embarq Florida, at that point, ceased its independent identity and began carrying on business under the CenturyLink name.

Embarq Florida’s legal name was changed in 2022 to CenturyLink of Florida, Inc., as it was retained by Lumen following Embarq’s sale to Brightspeed. Since Central Telephone Company was included in the sale to Brightspeed, the ownership of CenturyLink of Florida was transferred to another subsidiary within Lumen.

External links
CenturyLink Florida website (for former Embarq customers)

References

Lumen Technologies
Sprint Corporation
Telecommunications companies of the United States
Telecommunications companies established in 1925
Communications in Florida
1925 establishments in Florida